Tom Erik Heir Nordberg (born 10 July 1985) is a retired Norwegian football player who played as a defender.

Career statistics

References

1985 births
Living people
People from Levanger
Norwegian footballers
Rosenborg BK players
Ranheim Fotball players
Levanger FK players
FK Haugesund players
FK Bodø/Glimt players
Norwegian First Division players
Association football defenders
Sportspeople from Trøndelag